Unraveled or Unravelled may refer to:

 Unraveled (film), a 2010 American documentary film
 Unraveled, a 2005 album by Confessor
 Unravelled, a 1994 album by The Comsat Angels
 "Unravelled", a 1997 song by Jan Hellriegel

See also
 Unravel (disambiguation)
 Unraveller (disambiguation)
 Unravelling (disambiguation)